Germán Andrés Herrera (born 5 February 1993) is an Argentine professional footballer who plays as an attacking midfielder for Greek Super League 2 club Apollon Smyrnis.

Career
Herrera started his career with Boca Unidos. Carlos Trullet promoted Herrera to the club's senior squad in the 2013–14 Primera B Nacional campaign, with the midfielder making his professional debut on 6 June 2014 during a defeat to San Martín. His first goal in first-team football arrived in March 2016 against Atlético Paraná, which was the first of two in a total of ninety-one appearances for them in Primera B Nacional. On 8 July 2018, following Boca Unidos' relegation to Torneo Federal A, Herrera completed a loan move to Brown of Primera B Nacional. He appeared fifteen times for them, prior to returning to his parent club.

In July 2019, Herrera was loaned to Almagro; another Primera B Nacional team. He scored on his second appearance, netting in a 1–1 draw away to Villa Dálmine.

On 16 January 2021, Herrera joined Greek Olympiacos Volos. At the end of August 2021, Herrera moved to Gamma Ethniki club Panelefsiniakos.

Career statistics
.

References

External links

1993 births
Living people
Argentine footballers
Argentine expatriate footballers
Footballers from Rosario, Santa Fe
Association football midfielders
Primera Nacional players
Super League Greece 2 players
Boca Unidos footballers
Club Atlético Brown footballers
Club Almagro players
Olympiacos Volos F.C. players
Panelefsiniakos F.C. players
Argentine expatriate sportspeople in Greece
Expatriate footballers in Greece